Melissa Halvorson Wiklund (born 1962) is a Minnesota politician and member of the Minnesota Senate. A member of the Minnesota Democratic–Farmer–Labor Party (DFL), she represents District 50 in the southern Twin Cities metropolitan area, which includes the cities of Bloomington and Richfield. Senator Wiklund's legislative priorities include education, health care, and job creation.

Early life, education, and career
Wiklund was raised in Bloomington, Minnesota and graduated from Kennedy High School. Prior to her service in the Senate, Sen. Wiklund served on the Bloomington School Board for three years. She was elected to the Bloomington School Board in 2009 and later became its chair. On the School Board, Sen. Wiklund chaired the Legislative and Superintendent Evaluation Committees as well as participating on the Labor Management Committee. She attended the University of Minnesota, graduating with a B.E.E. and a degree in Interior Design in 1991.

Personal life
Wiklund is married to her husband, Craig. They have two children (Nathan & Emily) and reside in Bloomington, Minnesota.

Minnesota Senate
Wiklund was first elected to the Minnesota Senate in 2012. 
In the 2021 legislative session, Wiklund is serving on the Human Services Reform Finance and Policy Committee and the Technology and Reform Policy Committee. Wiklund is also the Ranking Minority Member Health and Human Services Finance and Policy Committee.

Past Committees
90th Legislative Session (2017-2018): E-12 Finance, Health and Human Services Finance and Policy, Local Government.
89th Legislative Session (2015-2016) (second half of Senate term): Finance: E-12 Policy and Budget Division, Health, Human Services and Housing, State and Local Government.
88th Legislative Session (2013-2014): Education, Finance: E-12 Division, Health, Human Services and Housing.

Legislative Action

Sen. Wiklund Co-authored:

SF 472, The Alec Smith Emergency Insulin Act (Introduced and first reading 01/24/2019). This bill would establish an insulin assistance program; establishing the insulin assistance account in the special revenue fund; requiring drug manufacturers to pay an insulin product fee; providing for emergency refills; appropriating money.

SF 820, Great Start for All Minnesota Children Act. This bill aims to address opportunity gaps and help the state's youngest residents, and it would provide additional funding for early childhood education and development, child care, prenatal care and home visiting.

SF 1708, Spoken Language Health Care Interpreter Registry. This bill would create a registry of interpreters that pass a test in English on health care terms and interpreter ethics and standards to minimize errors and restore patient confidence. In addition to registered interpreters, the bill includes a tier called "certified interpreters." To get this designation on the registry, interpreters would need to have a certification in health care interpreting from an organization specified by the Department of Health.

Electoral history

References

External links

Senator Melissa Halvorson Wiklund official Minnesota Senate website
Senator Melissa Halvorson Wiklund official campaign website

Living people
Democratic Party Minnesota state senators
1962 births
People from Bloomington, Minnesota
University of Minnesota alumni
Women state legislators in Minnesota
21st-century American politicians
21st-century American women politicians